Tuotuorou is a dish of the Yi people of Sichuan, Yunnan, Guizhou, and Guangxi provinces of China. It is often served to guests in Yi households, along with buckwheat pancakes (known as mgefu or mgamo), garlic soup and unpeeled boiled potatoes. This is seasoned with local herbs.

These are served in traditional Yi wooden dishes, and eaten with long-handled spoons instead of chopsticks.

See also

 List of pork dishes

References

External links
 China Quarterly, "Ethnic Entrepreneurship and Ethnic Identity: A Case Study Among the Liangshan Yi (Nuosu) in China", on p. 421 of article by Thomas Heberer.  (.pdf file)
 Chinadaytour
 Minzu Yi

Pork dishes
Sichuan cuisine
Yi people